Mikkelsplass is a surname. Notable people with the surname include:

 Hildegunn Mikkelsplass (born 1969), Norwegian biathlete
 Marit Mikkelsplass (born 1965), Norwegian cross-country skier
 Pål Gunnar Mikkelsplass (born 1961), Norwegian cross-country skier

Norwegian-language surnames